KVOE may refer to:

 KVOE (AM), a radio station (1400 AM) licensed to Emporia, Kansas, United States
 KVOE-FM, a radio station (101.7 FM) licensed to Emporia, Kansas